Banthra Tilhar is a village in Tilhar Tehsil and  Tilhar City of Uttar Pradesh in India.

References

Villages in Shahjahanpur district